Three Cheers for Love is a 1936 American musical film directed by Ray McCarey, written by George Marion, Jr., and starring Eleanore Whitney, Robert Cummings, William Frawley, Elizabeth Patterson, Roscoe Karns and John Halliday. It was released on June 26, by Paramount Pictures.

Plot

The showman Charles Dormant and wife Consuelo decide to send their daughter Sharon, familiarly known as "Skippy," to boarding school. Wilma Chester's school is going broke, so she permits old acquaintance Milton Shakespeare to bring his theatrical troupe to the school and stage a Thanksgiving show, hoping Skippy's dad will attend and offer everyone work in his professional theatrical revues.

Skippy is reluctant to perform until handsome songwriter Jimmy Tuttle changes her mind. She is shocked, however, when her father rejects an invitation to the show, unaware that Consuelo has answered it without showing it to him. Another shock comes when Eve Bronson turns up, claiming Jimmy's about to marry her and only pretending to like Skippy.

Once he learns about the show, Charles is delighted to come. By this time Skippy wants no part of it, but Jimmy carries her to the stage, convinces her to entertain, then drops to one knee and proposes marriage to her.

Cast 
Eleanore Whitney as Skippy Dormant
Robert Cummings as Jimmy Tuttle
William Frawley as Milton Shakespeare
Elizabeth Patterson as Wilma Chester
Roscoe Karns as Doc 'Short Circuit' Wilson
John Halliday as Charles Dormant
Grace Bradley as Eve Bronson
Veda Ann Borg as Consuelo Dormant
Louis Da Pron as Elmer
Olympe Bradna as Frenchy
Billy Lee as Johnny
Irving Bacon as Rider 
Si Wells as Winton
Inez Courtney as Dorothy
Phillips Smalley as Mr. Courtney Netherland
Florence Wix as Mrs. Courtney Netherland
Kitty McHugh as Wardrobe Mistress
Cynthia Duane as Makeup Girl
Donald Kerr as Property Man

Production
Cummings was cast in December 1935. Filming started in March 1936.

Reception
Frank Nugent of The New York Times said, "There came shyly yesterday to the Roxy Theatre a picture called Three Cheers for Love, and the best we can do is describe it as Hollywood's equivalent of the employes' annual picnic. Paramount—if our inference is correct—must have summoned a select number of its juveniles, praised them for their loyalty to the firm and, as a reward for good behavior, told them they could take a cameraman, director, a few sets and one of the lesser scripts and make a picture all by themselves. We gather that the youngsters enjoyed the picnic, but Paramount has no right to ask us to pay the bill."

References

External links 
 

1936 films
American black-and-white films
Films directed by Ray McCarey
Paramount Pictures films
American musical films
1936 musical films
1930s English-language films
1930s American films